Lindwurmia (named after the Lindwurm) is a rhomaleosaurid plesiosaur from the Early Jurassic of Germany. It contains a single species, Lindwurmia thiuda. The holotype consists of a single incomplete skeleton comprising the anterior part of the jaws, 69 vertebrae, partial pectoral and pelvic girdles and partial right fore and hind limbs.

References 

Extinct animals of Europe
Plesiosaurs
Fossil taxa described in 2019